Marijana Rupčić (born c. 1986) is a Croatian model. She was Miss Universe Croatia in 2004.

References

Living people
Croatian female models
Croatian beauty pageant winners
1986 births
Miss Universe 2004 contestants